Runggaldier is a surname. Notable people with the surname include:

Alexia Runggaldier (born 1991), Italian biathlete
Alfred Runggaldier (born 1962), Italian cross country skier 
Elena Runggaldier (born 1990), Italian ski jumper and Nordic combined skier
Lukas Runggaldier (born 1987), Italian Nordic combined skier
Peter Runggaldier (born 1968), Italian former Alpine skier